Geshnizuiyeh (also Romanized as Geshnīzū’īyeh; also known as Gīshnīzū’īyeh) is a village in Madvarat Rural District, in the Central District of Shahr-e Babak County, Kerman Province, Iran. At the 2006 census, its population was at 107, in 26 families.

References 

Populated places in Shahr-e Babak County